The 1923 New York Giants season was the franchise's 41st season. The Giants won the National League pennant with a 95–58 record.  The team went on to lose to the New York Yankees in the 1923 World Series, four games to two.

Regular season

Season standings

Record vs. opponents

Opening day lineup

Roster

Player stats

Batting

Starters by position
Note: Pos = Position; G = Games played; AB = At bats; H = Hits; Avg. = Batting average; HR = Home runs; RBI = Runs batted in

Other batters
Note: G = Games played; AB = At bats; H = Hits; Avg. = Batting average; HR = Home runs; RBI = Runs batted in

Pitching

Starting pitchers
Note: G = Games pitched; IP = Innings pitched; W = Wins; L = Losses; ERA = Earned run average; SO = Strikeouts

Other pitchers
Note: G = Games pitched; IP = Innings pitched; W = Wins; L = Losses; ERA = Earned run average; SO = Strikeouts

Relief pitchers
Note: G = Games pitched; W = Wins; L = Losses; SV = Saves; ERA = Earned run average; SO = Strikeouts

1923 World Series

Game 1
October 10, 1923, at Yankee Stadium in New York City

Game 2
October 11, 1923, at the Polo Grounds (IV) in New York City

Game 3
October 12, 1923, at Yankee Stadium in New York City

Game 4
October 13, 1923, at the Polo Grounds (IV) in New York City

Game 5
October 14, 1923, at Yankee Stadium in New York City

Game 6
October 15, 1923, at the Polo Grounds (IV) in New York City

References
 1923 New York Giants team page at Baseball Reference
 1923 New York Giants team page at Baseball Almanac

New York Giants (NL)
San Francisco Giants seasons
New York Giants season
National League champion seasons
New York Giants
1920s in Manhattan
Washington Heights, Manhattan